The 2023 Viaplay Nordic Darts Masters was the third staging of the tournament by the Professional Darts Corporation, and the second entry in the 2023 World Series of Darts. The tournament featured 16 players (eight 'elite' PDC players and eight regional qualifiers) and was held at the Forum Copenhagen in Copenhagen, Denmark on 20–21 January 2023.

 was the defending champion, after defeating  11–5 in the 2022 final.

 won the title, defeating  11–5 in the final. This was Wright's fourth World Series title, his first since 2019, when he won the German Darts Masters.

The event was announced on 26 September 2022, alongside the 2023 Bahrain Darts Masters, which was held a week earlier.

Prize money
The total prize fund remained at £60,000.

Qualifiers
The PDC announced 7 of their 8 players who would be their elite representatives at the event on 2 January 2023, which included Michael van Gerwen, who missed the 2023 Bahrain Darts Masters for family reasons.  was announced as the 8th representative on 4 January 2023.

The seedings are based on the 2023 World Series rankings after 1 event:

  (semi-finals)
  (runner-up)
  (quarter-finals)
  (champion)
  (quarter-finals)
  (semi-finals)
  (quarter-finals)
  (quarter-finals)

The Nordic & Baltic representatives consisted of their three Tour Card holders (and ), recent World Darts Championship qualifier , and four invited players from the region.

Draw
The draw was made on 16 January 2023.

References

Nordic Darts Masters
World Series of Darts
Sports competitions in Denmark
Nordic Darts Masters
Nordic Darts Masters